Calonotos niger is a moth of the subfamily Arctiinae. It was described by Max Gaede in 1926. It is found in the Amazon region.

References

Arctiinae
Moths described in 1926